The Sam Choy Brick Store, Angels Camp, California, is the only building remaining from a large Chinese settlement during the California gold rush.  It was listed on the National Register of Historic Places in 1984.

After it served as a general store, its owner sold it to Angels Camp for use as a jail. The Sam Choy Brick Store is still owned by the city of Angels Camp.

References 

History of Calaveras County, California
Chinese-American history
Chinese-American culture in California
Commercial buildings on the National Register of Historic Places in California
Commercial buildings completed in 1860
Neoclassical architecture in California
Buildings and structures in Calaveras County, California
National Register of Historic Places in Calaveras County, California